Eric Holthaus (born 1981) is a meteorologist and climate journalist. He is the founder of a weather service called Currently and started a publication called The Phoenix on Ghost. He was formerly a writer for The Correspondent, Grist, Slate and The Wall Street Journal and is known for his mentions of global climate change.

Biography 

Eric Holthaus grew up in Kansas. His writing during Hurricane Sandy resulted in a substantial following. During his career, he has advised numerous groups and individuals on coping with changing weather, including, for example, Ethiopian subsistence farmers. In 2013, feeling that his extensive air travel was contributing to the climate problem, Holthaus vowed to stop flying.

Holthaus is a co-founder of the podcast "Warm Regards" with paleoecologist Jacquelyn Gill and journalist Andy Revkin of The New York Times.

Holthaus left The Correspondent in November 2020 and started The Phoenix; The Correspondent itself ceased publication on January 1, 2021. He is a proponent of the Green New Deal and identifies as an eco-socialist.

Projects 

On November 6, 2022, Abbie Veitch and Eric Holthaus announced Project Mushroom, an initiative to create a safe social media service centered on climate protection.  The proposed service is to be run by users and its formation is in response to the harmful effects and biases embedded in established platforms like Twitter.

The Future Earth 
Holthaus's book The Future Earth, about imagining a future where society has reversed the effects of climate change, was released on June 30, 2020.  The book employs a "speculative journalism" approach to imagine how communities and society will respond, while interviewing and using sources from contemporary thinkers and scientists. Holthaus focuses on the large scale organizing and social change needed to address the climate crisis rather than relying solely on technological solutions.

Reception of the book was generally positive. Kirkus reviews called the book "an encouraging and diligently researched call to action" Undark Magazine called the book "a welcome antidote to more dystopian climate writers such as David Wallace-Wells". The podcast Warm Regards highlighted the book in comparison with Kim Stanley Robinson's The Ministry for the Future—noting that they both share a similarly optimistic and future forward approach to the climate crisis.

References

External links
Eric Holthaus at  Slate

American meteorologists
Slate (magazine) people
1981 births
Living people